Osgoode Ward (Ward 20) is a municipal ward located in the rural southeast corner of the City of Ottawa.  It mostly consists of the former Osgoode Township and parts of the former city of Gloucester. It is represented on Ottawa City Council by George Darouze.

The ward contains the communities of Greely, Osgoode, Metcalfe, Edwards, Kenmore, Vernon, South Gloucester, Ficko, Limebank and Johnston Corners.

The ward was created for the 2000 municipal elections in preparation for Osgoode Township's amalgamation into the city of Ottawa. Prior to that, Osgoode Township was located in Cumberland-Osgoode Ward on the Regional Municipality of Ottawa-Carleton regional council.

From 2000 to 2006, the ward consisted solely of the former Township of Osgoode. Beginning with the 2006 election, the boundaries changed to add much of rural southern Gloucester to the ward.

Election results

1994 Ottawa-Carleton Regional Municipality elections

 As Cumberland-Osgoode Ward

1997 Ottawa-Carleton Regional Municipality elections

 As Cumberland-Osgoode ward

2000 Ottawa municipal election

2003 Ottawa municipal election

2006 Ottawa municipal election

2010 Ottawa municipal election

2014 Ottawa municipal election

2018 Ottawa municipal election

2022 Ottawa municipal election

References

External links
 Map of Osgoode Ward

Ottawa wards